Dripping may refer to:

 Dripping liquid
 Dripping, animal fat used in cooking
 Dripping (art)
 Dripping cake, traditional bread from Great Britain
"Dripping", a song by Blonde Redhead from their 2014 album Barragán

See also
 Dripping Springs (disambiguation)
 Lizzie Dripping, British children's television show
 Drip (disambiguation)